Aglaia malabarica is a species of plant in the family Meliaceae. It is endemic to Kerala, India.

References

malabarica
Flora of Kerala
Critically endangered plants
Taxonomy articles created by Polbot